Brachycephalic airway obstructive syndrome (BAOS) is a pathological condition affecting short nosed dogs and cats which can lead to severe respiratory distress. There are four different anatomical abnormalities that contribute to the disease, all of which occur more commonly in brachycephalic breeds: an elongated soft palate, stenotic nares, a hypoplastic trachea, and everted laryngeal saccules (a condition which occurs secondary to the other abnormalities). Because all of these components make it more difficult to breathe in situations of exercise, stress, or heat, an animal with these abnormalities may be unable to take deep or fast enough breaths to blow off carbon dioxide. This leads to distress and further increases respiratory rate and heart rate, creating a vicious cycle that can quickly lead to a life-threatening situation.

Brachycephalic dogs have a higher risk of dying during air travel and many commercial airlines refuse to transport them.

Dogs experiencing a crisis situation due to brachycephalic syndrome typically benefit from oxygen, cool temperatures, sedatives, and in some cases more advanced medical intervention, including intubation.

BAOS is also referred to as Brachycephalic Airway Syndrome (BAS), Brachycephalic Syndrome (BS), and in the UK as Brachycephalic Obstructive Airway Syndrome (BOAS).

Causes and risk factors 

The primary anatomic components of BAOS include stenotic nares (pinched or narrowed nostrils), and elongated soft palate, tracheal hypoplasia (reduced trachea size), and nasopharyngeal turbinates.

Other risk factors for BAOS include a lower craniofacial ratio (shorter muzzle in comparison to the overall head length), a higher neck girth, a higher body condition score, and neuter status.

Recent studies led by the Roslin Institute at the University of Edinburgh's Royal School of Veterinary Studies has found that a DNA mutation in a gene called ADAMTS3 that is not dependent on skull shape is linked to upper airway syndrome in Norwich Terriers and is also common in French and English bulldogs. This is yet another indication that at least some of what is being called brachycephalic airway syndrome is not linked to skull shape and has previously been found to cause fluid retention and swelling

Signs and symptoms 

Dyspnea (breathing difficulty)
Noisy/labored breathing
Stridor (high pitched wheezing)
Continued open-mouth breathing
Extending of head and neck to keep airway open
Sitting up or keeping chin in an elevated position when sleeping
Sleeping with toy between teeth to keep mouth open to compensate for nasal obstruction
Cyanosis (blue/purple discoloration of the skin, due to poor blood oxygenation in the lungs )
Sleep apnea
Stress and heat intolerance during exercise.
Snoring, gagging, choking, regurgitation, vomiting
Collapse

Symptoms progress with age and typically become severe by 12 months.

Despite observing clinical signs of airway obstructions, some owners of brachycephalic breeds may perceive them as normal for the breed, and may not seek veterinary intervention until a particularly severe attack happens.

After waking from surgery, most dogs that are intubated will try to claw out their tracheal tube. In contrast, brachycephalic dogs often seem quite happy to leave it in place as it opens the airway, making it easier to breathe.

Secondary conditions
Other conditions may be observed concurrently. These include swollen/everted laryngeal saccules, which further reduce the airway, collapsed larynx, and chronic obstructive pulmonary disease caused by the increased lung workload.

Brachycephalic syndrome has been linked to changes in the lungs, as well as the gastrointestinal tract including bronchial collapse, gastroesophageal reflux, and chronic gastritis.

Diagnosis 
This syndrome is diagnosed on the basis of the dog's breed, clinical signs, and results of a physical examination by a veterinarian. Stenotic nares can usually be diagnosed on visual inspection. Diagnosis of an elongated soft palate, everted laryngeal saccules, or other associated anatomical changes in the mouth will require heavy sedation or full general anesthesia.

Treatment 

Treatment consists of surgery for widening the nostrils, removing the excess tissue of an elongated soft palate, or removing everted laryngeal saccules. Early treatment prevents secondary conditions from developing.

Potential complications include hemorrhages, pain, and inflammation during and after surgery. Some veterinarians are hesitant to perform soft palate correction surgery. With CO2 surgical lasers, these complications are greatly diminished.

Prevention 
To prevent or limit exacerbation of symptoms, avoid stress, and avoid exercise in high temperatures. Maintain lower body weight and avoid overfeeding. Use harnesses instead of collars to avoid pressure on the trachea.

The risk of brachycephalic syndrome increases as the muzzle becomes shorter. To avoid producing affected dogs, breeders may choose to breed for more moderate features rather than for extremely short or flat faces. Dogs with breathing difficulties, or at least those serious enough to require surgery, should not be used for breeding. Removing all affected animals from the breeding pool may cause some breeds to be unsustainable and outcrossing to non-brachycephalic breeds might be necessary.

Although outcrossing can attempt to lengthen the average snout length within a breed over time and reduce BAOS, it is not popular with established breed registries who record pedigrees of purebred dogs. In 2014, the Dutch government passed the Animals Act and the Animal Keepers Act, and subsequent enforcement caused the Dutch Kennel Club (Raad van Beheer) in 2020 to announce they were restricting registrations within 12 dog breeds based on snout length, and encouraging outcrosses to other breeds, while promising that future generations may be eligible for registration as purebreds. This caused concern with the Fédération Cynologique Internationale (FCI), of which RvB is a member, and with the American Kennel Club, both of which expressed concerns about governments legislating such matters.

Other health problems

Non-airway problems associated with brachycephalia may include:
Inflammation in skin folds
Mating and birthing problems
Malocclusion – misalignment of the teeth.
Dental crowding
Brachycephalic ocular syndrome 
Ectropion/entropion – inward/outward rolling of eyelid
Macropalpebral fissure
Lagophthalmia – inability to close eyelids fully
Exophthalmos/eye proptosis – abnormal protrusion of the eye
Nasal fold trichiasis – fur around the nose fold rubs against the eye.
Distichiasis – abnormally placed eyelashes rub against the eye.
Poor tear production
Gastrointestinal problems

See also
 Cephalic index – for lists of affected dog, cat, and other animal breeds

References 

Syndromes in dogs
Syndromes in cats